Dominique Rénia is a French professional football manager. In 2012, he coached the Saint Martin national football team.

References

External links
Saint Martin - Caribbean Football

Year of birth missing (living people)
Living people
Saint Martinois football managers
French football managers
Saint Martin national football team managers
Place of birth missing (living people)